Mo. Gov. may refer to:

Government of Missouri
Governor of Missouri